The Bill Finger Award for Excellence in Comic Book Writing is an American award for excellence in comic book writing. The awards committee, chaired by Mark Evanier, is charged each year with selecting two recipients, one living and one deceased. In 2020 due to the COVID-19 pandemic there were six deceased honorees and no living ones (and makeup plans for two living recipients in 2021). 2021 saw the same formula as the previous year, with six deceased recipients.

The award, along with the Eisner Awards, is presented in July of each year at the annual San Diego Comic-Con. It was established by Bill Finger's colleague and fellow writer Jerry Robinson.

Evanier in 2003 said the premise of the award was "to recognize writers for a body of work that has not received its rightful reward and/or recognition. That was what Jerry Robinson intended as his way of remembering his friend, Bill Finger. Bill is still kind of the industry poster boy for writers not receiving proper reward or recognition."

Recipients
2005 – Jerry Siegel (deceased), Arnold Drake
2006 – Harvey Kurtzman (deceased), Alvin Schwartz
2007 – Gardner Fox (deceased), George Gladir
2008 – Archie Goodwin (deceased), Larry Lieber
2009 – John Broome (deceased), Frank Jacobs
2010 – Otto Binder (deceased), Gary Friedrich
2011 – Bob Haney (deceased), 
2012 – Frank Doyle (deceased), Steve Skeates
2013 – Steve Gerber (deceased), Don Rosa
2014 – Robert Kanigher (deceased), Bill Mantlo, Jack Mendelsohn
2015 – Don McGregor, John Stanley (deceased)
2016 – Elliot S! Maggin, Richard E. Hughes (deceased)
2017 – William Messner-Loebs, Jack Kirby (deceased)
2018 – Joye Hummel Murchison Kelly, Dorothy Roubicek Woolfolk (deceased)
2019 – Mike Friedrich, E. Nelson Bridwell (deceased)
2020 – Virginia Hubbell (deceased), Nicola Cuti (deceased), Leo Dorfman (deceased), Gaylord DuBois (deceased), Joe Gill (deceased), France Herron (deceased)
2021 - Robert Bernstein (deceased), Audrey "Toni" Blum (deceased), Vic Lockman (deceased), Robert Morales (deceased), Paul S. Newman (deceased), Robert "Bob" White (deceased)
2022 – Bob Bolling, Don Rico (deceased)

References

Comics awards

Awards established in 2005